Sergey Kazankov (born 9 September 1972, Mar'ino, Yurinsky District) is a Russian political figure and a deputy of the 7th, and 8th State Dumas.
 
Sergey Kazankov was born in the family of the deputy of the 3rd State Duma Ivan Kazankov. Even though Kazankov graduated from the Kazan State Medical University, he left the profession and engaged in agriculture. In 2000, he became the General Director of the meat-packing plant "Zvenigovsky". From 2000 to 2016, he was the deputy of the State Assembly of the Mari El Republic of the 3rd, 4th, 5th, 6th convocations. In 2016, he was elected deputy of the 7th State Duma. Since September 2021, he has served as deputy of the 8th State Duma.

References
 

 

1972 births
Living people
Communist Party of the Russian Federation members
21st-century Russian politicians
Eighth convocation members of the State Duma (Russian Federation)
Seventh convocation members of the State Duma (Russian Federation)